Andrey Marcel Ferreira Coutinho (born January 12, 1990 in Brasil) is a Brazilian footballer.

Honours
 Young Africans
Tanzanian Premier League: 2014-15

References

External links
Thaileague Official Website: Samut Sakhon City F.C. Players

1990 births
Living people
Association football forwards
Place of birth missing (living people)
Brazilian footballers
Rakhine United F.C. players
Andrey Coutinho
Al-Sahel SC (Kuwait) players
Brazilian expatriate sportspeople in Kuwait
Kuwait Premier League players
Young Africans S.C. players
Andrey Coutinho
Brazilian expatriate sportspeople in Tanzania
Brazilian expatriate sportspeople in Thailand
Brazilian expatriate sportspeople in Myanmar
Paysandu Sport Club players
Expatriate footballers in Kuwait
Expatriate footballers in Tanzania
Expatriate footballers in Myanmar
Expatriate footballers in Thailand
Tanzanian Premier League players